Vilimaina Davu (born 15 January 1977 in Nadi, Fiji) is a Fijian and New Zealand netball player, who has represented both countries in international netball as a goal keeper. She has also played basketball at an international level.

Netball career
On the netball court she was a veteran of more than 100 international tests. She made her senior international debut for Fiji in 1993, playing in 57 tests for her country of birth until 1999.

In June 2000, Vilimaina was part of Team Pasifika who met the Silver Ferns in Auckland on 27 June and Palmerston North on 29 June.

She then went on to join the World 7 team who played against the Silver Ferns, coached by Jill McIntosh. The World 7 team featured Kath Harby (Australia), Elaine Davis (Jamaica), Leana Du Plooy (South Africa) and Vilimaina Davu (Fiji) and Team Pasifika.

She moved to New Zealand in 2000 and quickly established herself in the Silver Ferns defence circle. During her Silver Ferns career, Davu became well known for her tough defensive style and frequent contact penalties.

She also won the Fijian Sportswoman of the Year in 2000.

Vilimaina won Sports Personality of the Year by Sport Canterbury for netball in 2002.

The 2003 Halberg Awards in New Zealand were dominated by netball. Vilimaina was part of the Silver Ferns team who were honoured with the Team of the Year award. The 2003 Silver Ferns were: Anna Stanley (née Rowberry) (captain), Irene van Dyk, Tania Dalton, Belinda Colling, Temepara George, Sheryl Scanlan (née Clark), Vilimaina Davu, Lesley Rumball (née Nicol), Adine Wilson, Anna Harrison (ne'e Scarlett), Jodi Brown (née Te Huna), Leana de Bruin (née du Plooy). Coach: Ruth Aitken. Assistant Coach: Leigh Gibbs. Manager: Sheryl Wells.

After six years playing for New Zealand, with 61 appearances, Davu retired from international netball in 2006, and joined Fiji Netball as head coach of the national team to prepare them for the 2007 Netball World Championships in Auckland. Davu became a player-coach (similar to what Waisale Serevi did in sevens rugby) before the start of the tournament, joining the team as a goal keeper after they suffered several player injuries. However, Fiji had a disappointing showing at the 2007 World Championships and Davu resigned from her position.

In 2008, she returned to New Zealand and signed to play with the Northern Mystics in the ANZ Championship and became second ineligible player after Catherine Latu. Davu is also a weight-loss ambassador for Jenny Craig in New Zealand and is featured on their advertisements.

2009 saw Vilimaina return to coaching at a premier level for Auckland's Netball Waitakere where she has held this position for the past three years.

In 2011 Vilimaina attended the BEST Leadership Academy. Their Leadership Programme blends post-graduate courses for business leadership and entrepreneurship interwoven within a Pasifika context. The Pasifika Leadership Programme's unique Pasifika context and content includes a combination of workshops, experiences, e-learning components, Distinguished Speakers and mentoring by noted leaders. Vilimaina was part of the 2011 cohort and will graduate in April 2013.

12 October 2014 saw Vilimaina inducted into the Fiji Hall of Fame for her netballing achievements.

Vilimaina has been a regular on the speaking circuit since 2003 and frequently gives motivational speeches to communities including youth groups, sporting fraternities and at corporate events.

References

1977 births
Living people
Fijian netball players
New Zealand netball players
New Zealand international netball players
Commonwealth Games gold medallists for New Zealand
Commonwealth Games silver medallists for New Zealand
Commonwealth Games medallists in netball
Netball players at the 2002 Commonwealth Games
Netball players at the 2006 Commonwealth Games
2003 World Netball Championships players
Northern Mystics players
ANZ Championship players
Northern Force players
New Zealand people of I-Taukei Fijian descent
Sportspeople from Nadi
Canterbury Flames players
Medallists at the 2002 Commonwealth Games
Medallists at the 2006 Commonwealth Games